Alessandro Marchesini (30 April 1664 – 27 January 1738) was an Italian painter  and art merchant of the late-Baroque and Rococo, active in Northern Italy and Venice. He first trained in Verona with Biagio Falcieri and then with Antonio Calza. He then moved to Bologna, to work in the studio of Carlo Cignani. He is described as gaining fame for his allegories with small figures. He painted in for the church of San Silvestro, Venice; and for the church of Santo Stefano, Verona. He is also remembered for recommending a young painter, Canaletto, to the Lucchese art collector Stefano Conti, stating that he was like Luca Carlevaris but with a sun shining. Among his pupils is Carlo Salis.

Sources
Studi sopra la storia della pittura italiana dei secoli xiv e xv e della scuola pittorica. By Cesare Bernasconi. Published 1864. Page 372 (google books). Original from Oxford University

External links

1664 births
1738 deaths
17th-century Italian painters
Italian male painters
18th-century Italian painters
18th-century Italian businesspeople
Italian Baroque painters
Painters from Verona
18th-century Italian male artists